Nowgiri (also Romanized as Nowgīrī; also known as Nogerī) is a village in Balatajan Rural District, in the Central District of Qaem Shahr County, Mazandaran Province, Iran. At the 2006 census, its population was 93, with 29 families.

References 

Populated places in Qaem Shahr County